Marc et Claude were a German electro-trance music duo consisting of Marc Romboy and Klaus Derichs. The two also co-own the label Alphabet City, which houses such artists as Ferry Corsten and Future Breeze. The two started producing seriously during the explosion of German trance in the mid-to-late 1990s. Their first release, "Toulouse" was on their own label, Le Petit Prince Records. In 1997, the duo teamed up with Jürgen Driessen and produced the track "La" which went to the top of the German dance charts and helped them crossover to UK audiences.

They had several UK top 40 hits during the late 1990s and early 2000s, including their biggest hit "I Need Your Lovin' (Like the Sunshine)" (#12) which samples the Korgis' "Everybody's Got to Learn Sometime" which served as a dedication to their summer tour, affiliated with the island of Ibiza.

Discography

Albums
2003 - You Own the Sound

Singles

Notes:
I  "Loving You" was remixed and re-released in 2003, under the name "Loving You 2003". It is this version that charted on both the German and UK charts.

References

External links
Marc et Claude at Discogs

Musical groups established in 1993
German house music groups
German electronic music groups
German dance music groups
German trance music groups
German techno music groups